Walterianella is a genus of flea beetles in the family Chrysomelidae. There are more than 40 described species in Walterianella. They are found in Central and South America.

Species
These 47 species belong to the genus Walterianella:

 Walterianella albipennis (Jacoby, 1894)
 Walterianella amazona (Bowditch)
 Walterianella apicicornis (Jacoby)
 Walterianella argentiniensis (Jacoby)
 Walterianella atropunctata (Jacoby, 1905)
 Walterianella biarcuata (Chevrolat, 1834)
 Walterianella bondari Bechyné & Bechyné, 1977
 Walterianella bucki Bechyné, 1956
 Walterianella callipoda Bechyné, 1955
 Walterianella centromaculata (Jacoby)
 Walterianella championi
 Walterianella colombiana (Jacoby)
 Walterianella decora (Jacoby)
 Walterianella diascopica Bechyné, 1958
 Walterianella diversa (Jacoby)
 Walterianella durangoensis (Jacoby, 1892)
 Walterianella eleagna Bechyné, 1955
 Walterianella exclamationis (Jacoby)
 Walterianella fuscoannulata (Jacoby)
 Walterianella gouini Bechyné, 1958
 Walterianella hackmani (Jacoby)
 Walterianella humeralis (Fabricius, 1801)
 Walterianella humilis (Illiger, 1807)
 Walterianella informis (Jacoby, 1905)
 Walterianella ingrata (Jacoby)
 Walterianella inscripta (Jacoby, 1886)
 Walterianella interruptovittata (Jacoby, 1905)
 Walterianella nigrobasalis (Jacoby, 1905)
 Walterianella nigronotata (Jacoby)
 Walterianella oculatus (Fabricius, 1801)
 Walterianella ophthalmica (Harold)
 Walterianella pallidocincta (Jacoby)
 Walterianella palpalis (Jacoby, 1894)
 Walterianella parallina (Jacoby)
 Walterianella peruviana (Jacoby)
 Walterianella propugnaculum (Illiger, 1807)
 Walterianella quadripunctata (Schaufuss, 1874)
 Walterianella sellata (Fabricius, 1801)
 Walterianella signata (Jacoby, 1886)
 Walterianella similis (Bowditch)
 Walterianella spilota (Balý, 1878)
 Walterianella sublineata (Jacoby, 1886)
 Walterianella tabida (Jacoby, 1894)
 Walterianella tenuicincta (Jacoby, 1886)
 Walterianella transversalis (Jacoby, 1886)
 Walterianella venustula (Schaufuss, 1874)
 Walterianella xanthomelaena Bechyné, 1955

References

Further reading

External links

 

Alticini
Chrysomelidae genera